Fox 22 may refer to one of the following television stations in the United States affiliated with the Fox Broadcasting Company:

Current
KEQI-LD in Dededo, Guam
KFCT in Fort Collins, Colorado
Satellite of KDVR in Denver, Colorado
WFVX-LD in Bangor, Maine

Former
K22EY/K22EY-D/KFXF-LD in Fairbanks, Alaska (2003 to 2017)
WLFL-TV/WLFL in Raleigh, North Carolina (1986 to 1998)